Georgi Strahilov Svilenski (born 9 October 1970) is a Bulgarian engineer, politician and Member of the National Assembly. He is a member of the Bulgarian Socialist Party representing 24-Sofia 2.

He was elected to the 43rd Assembly in October 2014, and is a member of the Children, Youths and Sports Committee and Transport, Information Technologies and Communications Committee. He is also a member of the "Friendship alliance" groups with Azerbaijan, China, Montenegro, Russia and Vietnam.

He graduated with a degree in civil engineering from the University of Architecture, Civil Engineering and Geodesy in Sofia. He was previously a member of the Sofia Municipal Council.

Personal life
He was married for 13 years to Desislava Gencheva, who is remarried to Bulgarian president Rumen Radev. He has one son with Gencheva.

References 

1970 births
Living people
Members of the National Assembly (Bulgaria)
Bulgarian Socialist Party politicians
People from Veliko Tarnovo